British Anarchist Federation may refer to:
Anarchist Federation of Britain, an anti-war organisation established during World War II
Anarchist Federation (Britain), an anarchist organisation established in 1984